Made in Britain is a not-for-profit organisation that supports British manufacturers with a registered collective mark system, to help identify and verify the geographic provenance of the goods they make in the UK. The mark also aims to represent a standard of unity for British manufacturing sectors and aims to promote them together, with social and other media visibility in the UK and around the world. The organisation works collaboratively with other UK trade bodies, government departments and other groups that support skilled jobs, responsible business and sustainable manufacturing growth. It campaigns strategically all year round to promote British manufacturing.

History 
Made in Britain began as a commercial marketing campaign in 2011. This campaign was established by Stoves – a Prescot-based cooker manufacturer. Stoves launched a competition to design a logo for the newly established campaign. The winner was Cynthia Lee, a student designer from the University of Nottingham. On 11 July 2011, a design was unveiled and British businesses were invited to apply to use the logo for the first time. After receiving support from the Labour Party and with over 600 members on board, a new Made in Britain mark was commissioned in May 2013. The new design was finalised in June 2013 and Made in Britain was officially launched as an independent, non-profit organisation in December 2013.

A new collective mark for all manufacturers 

The actual iteration of the Made in Britain mark was created and designed by Kevin Lan and Miranda Bolter at The Partners. Inspired by a corner of the Union Flag, the mark is designed to be instantly recognisable as the Made in Britain organisation. When businesses join Made in Britain as a member they get licensed access for one year to the Made in Britain suite of marks to use on their products, packaging and marketing material.

Flexible in size and scope, it's used by more than 2000 businesses in a number of industries. From large-scale industrial products and vehicles down to independently manufactured textiles, the collective mark is clear indicator of the diversity of British manufacturing. Members can use the collective mark alongside their ISO accreditations, Queens Awards and Royal Warrant marks.

Following the successful launch of Made in Britain as a not-for-profit organisation, a board of non-executive directors was established, all volunteer from the membership group. The current board members are; visiting Prof. Chris Harrop OBE (chairman since 2016), Camilla Hadcock, Katy Moss, Warren Gell, Henry Beaver and Peter Atmore of Fracino In early 2015, the board of directors elected to employ a full-time Chief Executive Officer. John Pearce joined the organisation in April 2015, after working in Brazil for the UK government's GREAT Britain campaign.

Modern British manufacturing 
The uniqueness and appeal of the Made in Britain organisation is that it celebrates the diverse nature of British manufacturing today, in 50 product sectors. To join the organisation and be licensed to use the collective mark, businesses must become members of Made in Britain. To prove their eligibility, companies must be transparent in their claims and display supporting information about their manufacturing process and policies. Members are organised into four tiers depending on the financial turnover of the organisation. All members receive the same membership benefits, which are designed to help them sell more of what they make using the collective mark.

Manufacturing growth 
Made in Britain aims to unite, support and promote British manufacturing sectors and achieve more visibility for the mark. The website serves the general public as a look-up directory for British-made goods and the businesses that make them. Members also post their own news stories under strict regulations and the compulsory Made in Britain Code of Conduct.

References

External links
 

Non-profit organisations based in England
Business organisations based in the United Kingdom
2011 establishments in the United Kingdom
Organizations established in 2011
British brands